Like I Belong is the second album from English punk rock band Great Cynics. It was released through Bomber Music in April 2013.

Track listing

Personnel
Great Cynics
Giles Bidder - Vocals/Guitar
Iona Cairns - Vocals/Bass
Bob Barrett - Drums

References

2013 albums
Great Cynics albums